Kiunga is a port town on the Fly River in the Western Province of Papua New Guinea, just upstream from the D'Albertis Junction with the Ok Tedi River. It is the southernmost terminus of the Kiunga-Tabubil Highway. Local industry rests on a cornerstone of freight and haulage, particularly from the Ok Tedi Mine and provisioning for the much larger town of Tabubil. Natural rubber has been an emerging industry more recently, with a processing/manufacturing plant being built in town.

Description

Surrounding swamps and rainforest lowlands are of interest to birdwatchers, with a high chance of observing crowned pigeon, yellow-eyed starling, large fig parrot and flame bowerbird as well as a large variety of more common species.

Kiunga has reliable 24-hour power. Locals are friendly, and there is no significant crime. Dial-up internet access is possible during business hours. Short term accommodation is available. Although Kiunga is accessible by road, this provides access only from Tabubil via the Kiunga-Tabubil Highway.

There are flights to and from the capital, Port Moresby, by both Airlines PNG and Air Niugini.
Kiunga weather station readings are available online.
Its local geology is clay on limestone.

Population 
According to data for 2013, the city's population was 18,747 people. Historical data is listed below.

Climate
Kiunga has a tropical rainforest climate (Af) with very heavy rainfall year-round.

See also

Kiunga Urban LLG
Kiunga Rural LLG

References

Populated places in the Western Province (Papua New Guinea)